The Giro del Veneto is a semi classic European bicycle race held in the region of Veneto, Italy. The race is a 1.1 event on the UCI Europe Tour.

In 2012 the race merged with another Italian classic, Coppa Placci, after some financial problems, and was held under the name "Giro Del Veneto – Coppa Placci". It was to be the last edition for 9 years. In 2021, after a hiatus of 9 years, the race returned under its original name "Giro del Veneto".

Winners

Wins per country

References

External links
Official site 

UCI Europe Tour races
Cycle races in Italy
Classic cycle races
Recurring sporting events established in 1909
1909 establishments in Italy